The Berliner Lebensqualitätsprofil (BELP) is an assessment of subjective quality of life. It is the German version of
the Lancashire Quality of Life Profile.

In this test the subjective quality of life is rated as satisfaction in general and in different areas; social-relations, leisure, work, finances, living situation, family and security.

There is also a short version of this test, the BELP-KF.

References 
The paper written on the test:

Papers on the original Lancashire Quality of Life profile:

Psychological tests and scales